The 2020 FIBA Men's Olympic Qualifying Tournament in Victoria was one of four 2020 FIBA Men's Olympic Qualifying Tournaments. The tournament was held in Victoria, Canada. It was originally scheduled to take place from 23 to 28 June 2020 but was postponed due to the COVID-19 pandemic, to 29 June to 4 July 2021.

The tournament was played behind closed doors due to the pandemic.

Teams

Venue

Squads

Preliminary round
All times are local (UTC−7).

Group A

Group B

Final round

Semi-finals

Final

Final ranking

References

External links
Official website
Tournament summary

Qualifying
2020–21 in Canadian basketball
International basketball competitions hosted by Canada
Sports competitions in Victoria, British Columbia
Impact of the COVID-19 pandemic on the 2020 Summer Olympics
2021 in basketball
June 2021 sports events in Canada
July 2021 sports events in Canada